"The Glasses" is the third episode of the fifth season of the American sitcom Seinfeld. The 67th episode of the series overall, it was written by the writing team Tom Gammill and Max Pross, their respective debuts for the series, and directed by Tom Cherones. It first aired on NBC on September 30, 1993.

In this episode, Kramer tries to get George a discount at the optometrist's after his eyeglasses are seemingly stolen from the health club, and Jerry suspects his girlfriend Amy of having an affair with his cousin Jeffrey. George's first set of replacement glasses are women's glasses, so he tries to trade frames with a blind man. Rance Howard appears as the blind man in this episode, while Anna Gunn plays Amy. This episode ends with the dedication "In memory of our friend, John Oteri," who worked as a camera operator on the show.

Plot
George claims his eyeglasses were stolen at the health club and he needs a new pair. He goes to see Kramer's optometrist friend Dwayne, whom Kramer promises will give George a 30% discount because Kramer helped the optometrist break his sugar addiction. When Elaine joins George at the optometrist's office, a dog bites her; she becomes afraid of dogs and worries that she may have rabies. She unsuccessfully tries to learn the identity of the man who brought his dog into the office. She goes to the doctor but  fails to get a shot when the doctor mistakes "shot" for "gunshot"; after developing suspicious symptoms of rabies, Elaine finally gets a shot from the same doctor. 

While not wearing his glasses, George thinks he sees Jerry's girlfriend Amy kissing Jerry's cousin Jeffrey. He tells Jerry, who tries to get Amy to confess her infidelity, but she indignantly denies it. Jerry is astounded by George's ability to see fine details while squinting; however, after George mistakes an onion for an apple, he wonders if George was also mistaken about Amy and Jeffrey.

After trying on many pairs of glasses, George decides on a new style and buys them, but is distressed when Kramer later points out that they are women's glasses made by Gloria Vanderbilt. He also tells Kramer that Dwayne refused to give him a discount. Kramer goes to see Dwayne and threatens him with a candy bar, forcing him to reinstate the discount. George makes a deal with an unsuspecting blind man to trade the man's uncomfortable eyeglass frames with George's, and have the lenses switched. With his vision back, George realizes it was not Amy kissing Jeffrey, but a mounted policewoman affectionately petting her horse.

Kramer bursts into Jerry's apartment and accidentally jars Jerry's giant new air conditioner loose from the window; it falls to the sidewalk, crushing the dog that bit Elaine. Uncle Leo gives Jerry and Amy tickets to see Paul Simon live and tells them that Jeffrey apologized. Jerry thinks Jeffrey's apology is for seeing Amy, and rants at her until Uncle Leo says Jeffrey apologized for getting different seats for the Paul Simon show; upset about his accusations, Amy presumably breaks up with Jerry. At the health club, Jerry complains about the owner of the dog forcing him to pay the vet bill for the dog's injuries, while George continues to rant about his "stolen" glasses, which are on top of one of the lockers.

Production
The theft of writer Tom Gammill's glasses from a gym was the inspiration for George's predicament. Gammill's solution was to wear prescription goggles.

A short scene revealing that Amy was in fact having an affair with Jeffrey was filmed but deleted before broadcast.

References

External links 
 

Seinfeld (season 5) episodes
1993 American television episodes